Changzhou No.1 High School (formerly Zhengheng Middle School) is a four-star-rated high school in the Jiangsu Province, established in 1925. In a 2016 ranking of Chinese high schools that send students to study in American universities, it ranked number 29 in mainland China in terms of the number of students entering top American universities. It has least holidays among all of the schools in the city. The school is located in the center of Changzhou. The campus covers an area of 117 acres, over 40% of it wooded. There are about 2000 students, and 170 faculty and staff. Sports are a focus of the school's curriculum. Every year there are two sports meetings—one in spring and the other in autumn, which are festivals for teachers, students, and interested community members.

References

External links 
 Official site

Schools in Jiangsu